The Plovdiv International Exhibition of 1981 was regulated by the Bureau International des Expositions and took place from June 14 to July 12, 1981 in Plovdiv, Bulgaria. The exhibition had an area of 51 hectares. The sample application was filed on June 12, 1980 registering the event as a specialized exposition.

The exhibition theme was "hunting, fishing and men in society." The goal was to present the environment through the exhibits of the participating countries, the development of hunting in different parts of the world, showing the interaction between the hunting, fishing and the man in contemporary society, to contribute to maintain and strengthen the culture of hunting

References

External links
Official website of the BIE
 European Patent Office

See also
List of world's fairs

July 1981 events in Europe
World's fairs in Bulgaria
History of Plovdiv
1981 in Bulgaria